Novokazanka (Yañı Qaźan) is a rural locality (a village) in Yefremkinsky Selsoviet, Karmaskalinsky District, Bashkortostan, Russia. The population was 19 as of 2010. There is 1 street.

Geography 
Novokazanka is located 26 km south of Karmaskaly (the district's administrative centre) by road. Georgiyevka is the nearest rural locality.

References 

Rural localities in Karmaskalinsky District